Papilio epenetus is a species of swallowtail butterfly from the genus Papilio that is found in Ecuador.

Description
Tailless. The females is paler than the male. The forewing is without spots except at the margin. The hindwing has large yellowish white marginal spots, and in the female usually also some small discal spots.

Biology
Larvae are found on Citrus.

References

Lewis, H. L., 1974 Butterflies of the World  Page 24, figure 19 (female)

External links

 Butterfly Corner Images from Naturhistorisches Museum Wien

epenetus
Butterflies described in 1861
Papilionidae of South America
Taxa named by William Chapman Hewitson